WKYN (107.7 FM) is a radio station  broadcasting a classic country format. Licensed to Mount Sterling, Kentucky, the station serves the area of East-Central Kentucky between Lexington and Morehead.  The station is currently owned by Gateway Radio Works, Inc.

History
The station went on the air as WGGI on 1983-01-12.  on 1983-04-27, the station changed its call sign to WKCA, on 2007-10-01 to the current WKYN,
Call sign WKYN earlier pertained to the San Juan, Puerto Rico, station in the Caribbean-area's English-language Quality Broadcasting System chain. QBS included stations in US Virgin Islands and Ponce, PR. Alfredo Ramírez de Arellano was owner; Art Merrill, station manager; Troy W. Fields and later Nancy Frazer, sales managers; Bob Bennett, programming director. Its format was American music, divided into type by time slot. Sally Jessy (Raphael) had a morning talk show Monday through Friday.

References

External links

KYN
Country radio stations in Kentucky
1983 establishments in Kentucky
Radio stations established in 1983
Mount Sterling, Kentucky